Menahem Max Schiffer (24 September 1911, Berlin – 11 November 1997)) was a German-born American mathematician who worked in complex analysis, partial differential equations, and mathematical physics.

Biography
Schiffer studied physics from 1930 at the University of Bonn and then at the Humboldt University of Berlin with a number of famous physicists and mathematicians including Max von Laue, Erwin Schrödinger, Walter Nernst, Erhard Schmidt, Issai Schur and Ludwig Bieberbach. In Berlin he worked closely with Issai Schur. In 1934 Schiffer had his first mathematical publication. After the National Socialist regime removed Schur and many others from their academic posts, Schiffer, as a Jew, immigrated to British-controlled Palestine. On the basis of his 1934 mathematical publication, Schiffer received from the Hebrew University of Jerusalem his master's degree in 1934. He received there his doctorate in 1938 under Michael Fekete with thesis Conformal representation and univalent functions. In his dissertation he introduced the "Schiffer variation", a variational method for handling geometric problems in complex analysis. (He also introduced another important variational method.) In September 1952, he became a professor at Stanford University, as part of a Jewish refugee group of outstanding mathematical analysts, including George Pólya, Charles Loewner, Stefan Bergman, and Gábor Szegő.

With Paul Garabedian, Schiffer worked on the Bieberbach conjecture with a proof in 1955 of the special case n=4. He was a speaker (but not in the category of an Invited Speaker) at the International Congress of Mathematicians (ICM) in 1950 at Cambridge, Massachusetts, and was a plenary speaker at the ICM in 1958 at Edinburgh with plenary address Extremum Problems and Variational Methods in Conformal Mapping. In 1970 he was elected to the United States National Academy of Sciences. He retired from Stanford University as professor emeritus in 1977.

In 1981, Schiffer became a founding member of the World Cultural Council.

Upon his death he was survived by his wife Fanya Rabinivics Schiffer, whom he married in 1937, and their daughter Dinah S. Singer, an experimental immunologist.

Selected publications
with Leon Bowden: The role of mathematics in science, Mathematical Association of America 1984
with Stefan Bergman: Kernel functions and elliptic differential equations in mathematical physics, Academic Press 1953
with Donald Spencer: Functionals of finite Riemann Surfaces, Princeton 1954
with Ronald Adler, Maurice Bazin: Introduction to General Relativity, McGraw Hill 1965 xvi+ 451 pp. Illus.

References

External links
 

1911 births
1997 deaths
20th-century American mathematicians
Founding members of the World Cultural Council
Mathematical analysts
Jewish scientists
Hebrew University of Jerusalem alumni
Stanford University Department of Mathematics faculty
Members of the United States National Academy of Sciences
German emigrants to the United States